The New Guinea Act 1920 was an Act passed by the Parliament of the Commonwealth of Australia, which saw the transfer of the territory of German New Guinea from Germany to Australia under terms of the Treaty of Versailles.

The Act formally established New Guinea as a League of Nations Mandated Territory that was to be administered by Australia. The Act remained in effect until New Guinea's merger with Papua following the passage of the Papua and New Guinea Act 1949.

References

1920 in international relations
1920 in Australian law
Repealed Acts of the Parliament of Australia
Australia–Papua New Guinea relations
Territory of New Guinea
Australia–Germany relations